The Tiger's Daughter (1971) is the first novel by Indian American author Bharati Mukherjee.

Plot summary

The story revolves around Tara who was raised in Calcutta, educated at Vassar College in New York and is married to an American man. The novel explores her sense of culture shock when she travels back to India intertwined with the political situation in Calcutta and West Bengal.

Publication history
 Hardcover – , published in 1971 by Houghton Mifflin
 Paperback – , published in 1992 by Fawcett Crest

External links
Powell's book review

1971 American novels
Novels by Bharati Mukherjee
Novels set in Kolkata
Houghton Mifflin books
Indian diaspora in fiction
Indian-American culture
1971 debut novels